Gibberula boulmerkae is a species of sea snail, a marine gastropod mollusk, in the family Cystiscidae. It is named after Algerian athlete Hassiba Boulmerka.

Description
The length of the shell attains 2.2 mm.

Distribution
This marine species occurs off Guadeloupe.

References

boulmerkae
Gastropods described in 2015